Morri Creech (born 1970) is an American poet. His collection The Sleep of Reason was a finalist for the 2014 Pulitzer Prize for poetry, and his collection Field Knowledge (2006) won the Anthony Hecht Poetry Prize from Waywiser Press. He has received a National Endowment for the Arts fellowship and a Ruth Lilly Fellowship from the Poetry Foundation, and has twice been nominated for a Pushcart Prize. He is the Writer in Residence at Queens University of Charlotte in Charlotte, North Carolina.

References

1970 births
Living people
American male poets
21st-century American poets
21st-century American male writers
Queens University of Charlotte faculty